Arnold Eric Sevareid (November 26, 1912 – July 9, 1992) was an American author and CBS news journalist from 1939 to 1977. He was one of a group of elite war correspondents who were hired by CBS newsman Edward R. Murrow and nicknamed "Murrow's Boys." Sevareid was the first to report the Fall of Paris in 1940, when the city was captured by German forces during World War II.

Sevareid followed in Murrow's footsteps as a commentator on the CBS Evening News for thirteen years, for which he was recognized with Emmy and Peabody Awards.

Early life 
Sevareid was born in central North Dakota at Velva to Alfred Eric and Clara Pauline Elizabeth Sevareid (née Hougen). After the failure of the bank in Velva in 1925, his family moved to nearby Minot, and then to Minneapolis, Minnesota, settling on 30th Avenue North. He attended Central High School in Minneapolis. Sevareid graduated from the University of Minnesota in 1935. A descendant of Norwegian immigrants, he preserved a strong bond with Norway throughout his life.

Sevareid was adventurous from a young age; several days after he graduated from Central High School in 1930, he and his friend Walter Port embarked on an expedition sponsored by the Minneapolis Star, from Minneapolis to York Factory, on Hudson Bay. They canoed up the Minnesota River and its tributary, the Little Minnesota River, to Browns Valley, portaged to Lake Traverse, and descended the Bois des Sioux River to the Red River of the North, which led to Lake Winnipeg. Sevareid's book, Canoeing with the Cree (1935), was the result of this canoe trip and is still in print.

Early career 
At age 18, Sevareid entered journalism as a reporter for the Minneapolis Journal while he was a student at the University of Minnesota in political science. He continued his studies abroad, first in London and then in Paris at the Sorbonne University, where he also worked as an editor for United Press. Sevareid then became city editor of the Paris Herald Tribune, and later joined CBS as a foreign correspondent based in Paris.

Sevareid broadcast the Fall of Paris and followed the French government from there to Bordeaux and then Vichy before he left France for London and later Washington, D.C. He was appointed as CBS's Washington bureau chief in July 1942.

He wrote about the Plains influence on his life in his early memoir, Not So Wild A Dream (1946). The book is still in print and covers his life in Velva, his family, the Hudson Bay trip, his hitchhiking around the U.S., mining in the Sierra Nevada, the Great Depression years, his early journalism, and (especially) his experiences in World War II.

Wartime reporting

Relationship with Edward Murrow 
Sevareid's work during World War II, with Edward Murrow as one of the original Murrow's Boys, was at the forefront of broadcasting. In 1940, he was the first to report on the Fall of France. Shortly afterward, he joined Murrow to report on the Battle of Britain. Later, Sevareid would refer fondly to the early years working with Murrow: "We were like a young band of brothers in those early radio days with Murrow." In his final broadcast with CBS, in 1977, he would call Murrow the man who "invented me."

Rescue in Burma 
On August 2, 1943, Sevareid was on board a Curtiss-Wright C-46 Commando that, having taken off from Assam in India, developed engine trouble over Burma while it was on a Hump airlift mission. He grabbed a bottle of Carew's gin before he parachuted out of the plane. The U.S. Army Air Forces formed a search and rescue team to bring the group out from behind enemy lines. The operatives parachuted in, located the party, and evacuated them safely to India, for which John Paton Davies Jr. later won the Medal of Freedom.  Davies was a U.S. diplomat who, having been a passenger himself, initially led the group away from the crash site and out of harm's way before the rescuers arrived.

Yugoslavia 
In Yugoslavia, Sevareid later reported on Josip Broz Tito's Yugoslav Partisans.

Later career 

After the war, Sevareid continued to work for CBS. He had begun his own program, Eric Sevareid and the News, on June 27, 1942, on CBS; it ran for five minutes, starting at 8:55 (ET) on Saturdays and Sundays. In 1946, he reported on the founding of the UN and then penned Not So Wild a Dream (University of Missouri Press, 1946). The book, whose title comes from part of the closing passage of Norman Corwin's radio play "On a Note of Triumph," appeared in eleven printings and became one of the primary sources on the lives of the generation of Americans who had lived through the Great Depression, only to confront the horrors of World War II. In the 1976 edition of the book, Sevareid wrote, "It was a lucky stroke of timing to have been born and lived as an American in this last generation. It was good fortune to be a journalist in Washington, now the single news headquarters in the world since ancient Rome. But we are not Rome; the world is too big, too varied."

Sevareid always considered himself a writer first and often felt uneasy behind a microphone and even less comfortable on television. Nonetheless, he worked extensively for CBS News on television for decades after the war. During the middle and the end of 1950s, Sevareid found himself on television as the host and science reporter of CBS's Conquest. He also served as the head of the CBS Washington bureau from 1946 to 1954 and was one of the early critics of Joseph McCarthy's anticommunism tactics.

Investigated by FBI 
Internal FBI documents declassified in 1996 show that the agency took an active interest in Sevareid's reporting and activities in the 1940s and the early 1950s. A March 1953 document, "Security Information", is one of several to chronicle Sevareid's activities during the 1940s. It refers to unsubstantiated reports that Sevareid, while he was attending the University of Minnesota in 1941, was alleged to have associated with communists. The files also alleged that while working for the school newspaper at the university, Sevareid participated in an active campaign against the ROTC. The files also noted his involvement in an awards banquet held by the Joint Anti-Fascist Refugee Committee, which had been designated a communist organization by Executive Order 9835. The files note a May 17, 1945, report in the Daily People's World, which stated Sevareid was a scheduled speaker at the Committee's banquet. The FBI called the Daily People's World a West Coast communist newspaper and claimed that Sevareid was identified as a radio commentator in its reports.

Other information in the FBI files noted a May 19, 1945 "newspapermen's forum," "The Free Press," was held at the California Labor School, and Sevareid participated. In two separate 1948 reports, Attorney General Tom C. Clark called the California Labor School "a subversive and Communist organization." The files included information that Sevareid's name was listed as one of those who was willing to raise funds to help support Hollywood celebrities appearing before the House Committee on Un-American Activities in 1947. The information received by the FBI about Sevareid's purported Communist activity was provided by "a representative of another governmental agency" and was never confirmed by investigations.

The information contained in the bureau's files was circulated during March 1953 while Sevareid anchored a CBS news program, A Report to the Nation. The FBI was specifically interested in his March 8 broadcast in which he interviewed Harold Stassen, Director for the Mutual Security Agency. The FBI developed information that documented what they alleged was his "disloyal" activities.

By April 1953, the FBI documents show that the bureau found no reason to open a more extensive investigation into Sevareid's activities.

European correspondent 
Sevareid wound up the 1950s as CBS's roving European correspondent from 1959 to 1961. He contributed stories to CBS Reports during that time and served as moderator on a number of CBS series such as Town Meeting of the World, The Great Challenge, Where We Stand, and Years of Crisis. Sevareid also appeared in or on CBS coverage of every presidential election from 1948 to 1976, the year before his retirement.

Final interview with Adlai Stevenson 
One of Sevareid's biggest scoops from this time period was his 1965 exclusive interview with Adlai Stevenson II shortly before Stevenson's death. The interview was not broadcast over CBS but instead appeared in Look magazine. However, it was Sevareid's familiar "think-pieces," which familiarized him with viewers worldwide.

CBS Evening News appearances 
On November 22, 1963, Sevareid joined Walter Cronkite on CBS television with a commentary about the assassination of John F. Kennedy and the road ahead for the new president, Lyndon Johnson. From 1964 to his 1977 retirement from the network, Sevareid's two-minute segments on the CBS Evening News (anchored by Cronkite) inspired his admirers to dub him "The Grey Eminence."

During his long run as a commentator, his segments earned both Emmy and Peabody Awards. In 1987, he was honored as an inductee into the Academy's Fourth Hall of Fame. Those who disagreed with his views nicknamed him "Eric Severalsides." Sevareid recognized his own biases, which caused some to disagree with him vehemently. He said that as he had grown older, he had tended to become more conservative in foreign policy and liberal in domestic policy.

His commentary touched on many of the day's important issues. After a 1966 trip to South Vietnam, he commented that prolonging the war would be unwise and that the US would be better off pursuing a negotiated settlement. He also helped keep alive another Murrow tradition at CBS that began with the interview show Person to Person. On Conversations with Eric Sevareid, he interviewed such famous newsmakers as West German Chancellor Willy Brandt and novelist Leo Rosten. In somewhat of a spoof of that tradition, he also had a conversation with King George III, portrayed by Peter Ustinov, titled The Last King in America.

Sevareid later narrated the American history series Between The Wars. In 1981, Sevareid hosted a documentary series on PBS, entitled Enterprise, a profile on how America portrays business. The following year, he hosted the syndicated newsmagazine program Eric Sevareid's Chronicle.

He made a guest appearance as himself in a 1980 episode of the sitcom Taxi and also played himself in the 1983 space flight film The Right Stuff.

Personal life 
Sevareid married the former Lois Finger. They had twin sons, Peter and Michael, born in Paris while Sevareid was stationed there as a war correspondent for CBS.

Sevareid's second marriage was to Belen Marshall. They had a daughter, Cristina, born in New York while he was working as a commentator at the New York bureau.

Death 
Sevareid died of stomach cancer in Washington, D.C., on July 9, 1992, at age 79.

Honors 

1950, 1964, 1976: Peabody Award
1954: Alfred I. duPont Award
1964: State of North Dakota  Theodore Roosevelt Rough Rider Award
1965: New York Newspaper Guild Page One Award
1977: Paul White Award, Radio Television Digital News Association
Emmy Award winner:
Best News Reporter or Commentator – 1955
Best News Commentary – 1958
1993: Inducted posthumously into the Scandinavian-American Hall of Fame
On October 5, 2007, the United States Postal Service announced that it would honor five journalists of the 20th century with first-class rate postage stamps, to be issued on Tuesday, April 22, 2008: Martha Gellhorn, John Hersey, George Polk, Rubén Salazar, and Eric Sevareid; Postmaster General Jack Potter announced the stamp series at the Associated Press Managing Editors Meeting in Washington, D.C.; Sevareid had covered the fall of France to the Germans in World War II; he was a critic of Sen. Joseph McCarthy's anti-communism campaign

See also 
Alfred and Clara Sevareid House

References

Works 
 Canoeing with the Cree, 1935, reprinted 1968 
 Not So Wild a Dream (autobiography), 1946, reissued 1976 
 In One Ear: 107 Snapshots of Men and Events which Make a Far-Reaching Panorama of the American Situation at Mid-Century (essays), Knopf, 1952.
 Small Sounds in the Night: A Collection of Capsule Commentaries on the American Scene, Knopf, 1956.
 This is Eric Sevareid (essays), McGraw, 1964.
 (With Robert A. Smith) Washington: Magnificent Capital, Doubleday, 1965.
 (With John Case) Enterprise: The Making of Business in America, McGraw-Hill, 1983.

Related reading 
 Raymond A. Schroth  (1995) The American Journey of Eric Sevareid  (Steerforth Press) 
 T. Harrell Allen (2017)  The Voice of Reason: Eric Sevareid's CBS Commentaries (CreateSpace Independent Publishing Platform)

External links 
 Yesterday's News Excerpt from "Canoeing with the Cree" series, Minneapolis Star, September 6, 1930
  Recording of final broadcast message, November 30, 1977.
 
 Raymond A. Schroth, S.J. Research Papers for Sevareid Biography Finding Aid at Loyola University New Orleans
Eric Sevareid Awards Midwest Broadcast Journalists Association
Eric Sevareid papers Library of Congress Manuscript Division

1912 births
1992 deaths
American broadcast news analysts
American people of Norwegian descent
American radio reporters and correspondents
American television journalists
CBS News people
Deaths from cancer in Washington, D.C.
Deaths from stomach cancer
Peabody Award winners
People from McHenry County, North Dakota
Radio personalities from Minneapolis
University of Minnesota School of Journalism and Mass Communication alumni
American war correspondents of World War II
Writers from North Dakota
60 Minutes correspondents
American male journalists
Journalists from North Dakota
Journalists from Minnesota
Central High School (Minneapolis, Minnesota) alumni
20th-century American journalists